The National Bureau of Fish Genetic Resources is a research organization dedicated to the preservation and study of fish genetic resources. They work to identify, document, and conserve the genetic diversity of fish species, which is important for maintaining healthy and sustainable fish populations. Their research helps support the development of policies and practices for sustainable aquaculture and fishing, as well as for conserving important fish species for future generations.

References

 "Sustainable Aquaculture and Fisheries" report, United Nations Food and Agriculture Organization: https://www.fao.org/3/ca8487en/CA8487EN.pdf
 "Conservation of Fish Biodiversity" research article, Journal of Biodiversity and Environmental Sciences: https://www.omicsonline.org/open-access/conservation-of-fish-biodiversity-2161-0525-1000230.pdf

1983 establishments in Uttar Pradesh
Research institutes in Lucknow
Fishing in India